Wittrockfjellet is a mountain in Nathorst Land at Spitsbergen, Svalbard. It is named after Swedish botanist Veit Brecher Wittrock. The mountain is located at the northern side of Van Keulenfjorden. It has a length of about 3.5 kilometers, and its highest peak is 931 m.a.s.l. The valley of Wittrockdalen separates Wittrockfjellet from the ridge of Brogniartfjella.

References

Mountains of Spitsbergen